Dominique Scott-Efurd (born 24 June 1992) is a South African long-distance runner who competed at the 2016 and 2020 Summer Olympics.

Prep
Dominique Scott graduated from Rhenish Girls' High School in Stellenbosch, South Africa. Scott's personal-best times of 4:28 in the 1,500m, 9:40 in the 3,000m, and 34:28 in the 10K road race garnered the attention of Lance Harter of Arkansas.

College
Dominique Scott graduated from University of Arkansas in Marketing in May 2015. She ran 5th fastest 3000 metres indoor track and field in NCAA history as of 2015.

Dominique Scott finished 6th at the 2014 NCAA cross country championships. Scott is a three-time SEC cross country, three-time indoor, and four-time outdoor champion.

Source:
Source:

Professional
16 July, 2022, Scott-Efurd placed 17th at 2022 World Championships in Athletics - Women's 10,000 metres#Final in 31:40.73 in Eugene, Oregon, USA.

7 August, 2021, Scott-Efurd placed 20th at Athletics at the 2020 Summer Olympics – Women's 10,000 metres#Final in 32:14.05.

30 July, 2021, Scott-Efurd placed 26th at Athletics at the 2020 Summer Olympics – Women's 5000 metres in 15:13.94.

October 5, 2019, Scott-Efurd placed 15th at 2019 World Championships in Athletics - Women's 5000 metres#Final in 15:24.47.

25 April, 2019, Scott-Efurd placed 2nd at the South African Championship in 16:13.71.

30 March, 2019, she competed at 2019 IAAF World Cross Country Championships – Senior women's race but did not finish.

16 March 2018, Scott-Efurd placed 1st and won the 5000 meters Athletics South Africa title at Bestmed Tuks in Pretoria.

On September 11, 2017, Dominique Scott-Efurd placed 6th in the 2017 New York Road Runners Fifth Avenue Mile Road One Mile in a time of 4:19.6 at New York, New York.

On 19 August 2017, Scott-Efurd placed 5th in the One Mile in a time of 4:30.24 at Falmouth, Massachusetts.

On 21 June 2017, Scott-Efurd placed 11th in the 3000 Metres in a time of 8:41.33 at Monaco (Stade Louis II).

On 16 July 2017, Scott-Efurd placed in the 1500 Metres in a time of 4:08.04 at Padua, Italy (Stadio Euganeo).

On 8 June 2017, Scott-Efurd placed 13th for 5000 Metres in a time of 15:20.10 at IAAF 2017 Diamond League – Golden Gala Pietro Mennea in Roma at (Stadio Olimpico).

On April 2, 2017, Scott-Efurd placed 4th in 15:40 for 5 km at Carlsbad 5000.

In February 2017, Scott-Efurd set the South African national record indoor mile in 4:28.47 at Millrose Games.

January 2017, Scott-Efurd set South Africa indoor 3000 meters national records in 8:54.06 at IAAF world indoor tour in Boston, Massachusetts.

Scott-Efurd won a 15 km in 53:59 in Cape Town, South Africa 8 January 2017.

Dominique Scott represented South Africa at the 2016 Summer Olympics. She placed 21st in Athletics at the 2016 Summer Olympics – Women's 10,000 metres in a personal best time of 31:51.47.

Personal life
Dominique Scott-Efurd married Cameron Efurd in December 2015.

References

External links
 Dominique Scott at University of Arkansas
 
 
 
 
 Dominique Scott national results

1992 births
Living people
South African female middle-distance runners
South African female long-distance runners
Sportspeople from Cape Town
Olympic athletes of South Africa
Arkansas Razorbacks women's track and field athletes
Athletes (track and field) at the 2016 Summer Olympics
Athletes (track and field) at the 2020 Summer Olympics
South African Athletics Championships winners
20th-century South African women
21st-century South African women
Athletes (track and field) at the 2022 Commonwealth Games